Lucinda Martha Ruh (born 13 July 1979) is a Swiss former competitive figure skater. She is the 1996 Swiss national champion and the 1993 junior level national champion.

She is known for her outstanding spinning ability and her balletic skating. Nicknamed the "Queen of Spin", she is the longest and fastest spinner in the world ever. In April 2003, Ruh set a Guinness world record for the most continuous upright spins on ice (105). She toured with Stars on Ice, Champions on Ice, and numerous other world wide tours. She also authored her 2011 memoir Frozen Teardrop.

Personal life 
Lucinda Martha Ruh was born on 13 July 1979 in Zurich, Switzerland. Her family moved to Paris, France, not long after her birth and then to Tokyo, Japan, when she was four years old. She was initially more focused on ballet than skating and at age seven received a scholarship to the Royal Ballet of London. She also practiced the piano and cello.

Ruh lives in New York City. In May 2012, she gave birth to twin girls, Angelica and Angelina.

Career 
Ruh began skating in 1984, soon after moving to Japan. She decided to focus on skating as her main activity when she was about eight.

In 1986, Ruh began working with coach Nobuo Sato. She won the bronze medal at the Japan Junior Championships in 1994. Although she initially enjoyed jumps, her interest in them waned as she grew to 5'9" (175.26 cm), "Since the center of gravity was higher, combined with the rigid training while growing, I never really had a chance to get my timing and balance back. As a result, injuries from bad falls plagued me even more and I started not liking jumps."

In 1996, she moved to Toronto, Ontario, Canada to work with Toller Cranston. In 1997, she worked with Christy Ness in San Francisco, California but developed two Achilles tendinitis, a ruptured shoulder and Sciatica. In 1998, she moved to Harbin, China to train with Chen Lu's former coach, Hongyun Liu, but although her jumping improved, the Chinese federation objected to a non-national being trained by him. In December, she moved to Switzerland, where she met coach Oliver Höner; it was the first time she had resided in her birth country.

In the summer of 1999, she went to the U.S. and was briefly coached by Galina Zmievskaya but tore knee ligaments and returned to Switzerland for treatment. Her last ISU event was the 1999 Cup of Russia. She sustained an injury after falling on a jump during practice the day before the competition but took three Cortisone injections a day and finished 6th at the event. She later learned she had fractured her spine, resulting in two dislocated discs. Her spinning may also have resulted in subtle concussions. A study is underway to determine whether intensive training of spins may cause concussions.

Ruh represented Club des Patineurs de Geneve. She has cited the pair Ekaterina Gordeeva and Sergei Grinkov as the skaters she admired the most while growing up.

She is the 2000 and 2001 world professional bronze medalist.

Ruh has created over twenty different new spin positions now required at competitions.

Following her retirement, Ruh began working as a coach and a spinning coach specialist. On 3 April 2003, she set a world record for the most continuous upright spins on ice (105 revolutions) at the Rockefeller Plaza outdoor skating rink in New York City, beating the previous record of 60 revolutions by British figure skater Neil Wilson.

She toured around the world from 2000 to 2006 with Stars on Ice USA and Canada, Champions on Ice, Art on Ice to name a few. She skated for many charities and 9/11 memorial at Madison Square Garden and participated in the 2010 and 2011 iterations of "One Step Closer", a figure skating exhibition to benefit the AIDS Resource Foundation for Children. She is the author of Frozen Teardrop, a memoir published by SelectBooks on November 2011.

Programs

Competitive highlights 
GP: Champions Series / Grand Prix

References

External links 
 LucindaRuh.com - Official website

1979 births
Living people
Figure skaters from Zürich
Swiss emigrants to the United States
Swiss female single skaters